The 21st ceremony of the Forqué Awards was held on 11 January 2016 at the Palacio Municipal de Congresos in Madrid. The gala, aired on La 1, was hosted by Macarena Gómez and José Corbacho.

History 
The nominations were disclosed in December 2015. Truman and The Clan (running both in the Best Film and the Best Latin-American film categories) gathered the most nominations.

The gala got off to a late start because the regional president Cristina Cifuentes did not arrive in time. It featured musical performances by Antonio Orozco, Edurne, Manuel Carrasco, Pablo López and Soraya.  and Tricicle provided comic relief.

Santiago Segura was gifted the EGEDA Gold Medal recognizing a career in the film industry.

Winners and nominees
The winners and nominees are listed as follows:

References

External links 
 Gala of the 21st Forqué Awards on RTVE Play

Forqué Awards
2016 film awards
2016 in Madrid